Trump: The Art of the Deal is a 1987 book credited to Donald J. Trump and journalist Tony Schwartz. Part memoir and part business-advice book, it was the first book credited to Trump, and helped to make him a household name. It reached number 1 on The New York Times Best Seller list, stayed there for 13 weeks, and altogether held a position on the list for 48 weeks. The book received additional attention during Trump's 2016 campaign for the presidency of the United States. Trump cited it as one of his proudest accomplishments and his second-favorite book after the Bible.

Schwartz called writing the book his "greatest regret in life, without question," and both he and the book's publisher, Howard Kaminsky, alleged that Trump had played no role in the actual writing of the book. Trump has personally given conflicting accounts on the question of authorship.

Synopsis 
The book talks about Trump's childhood in Jamaica Estates, Queens. It then describes his early work in Brooklyn prior to moving to Manhattan and building The Trump Organization, his actions and thoughts in developing the Grand Hyatt Hotel and Trump Tower, in renovating Wollman Rink, and regarding various other projects. The book also contains an 11-step formula for business success, inspired by Norman Vincent Peale's The Power of Positive Thinking.

Development
Trump was persuaded to produce the book by Condé Nast owner Si Newhouse after the May 1984 issue of his magazine GQ—with Trump appearing on the cover—sold well. Journalist Tony Schwartz was recruited directly by Trump after he read Schwartz's extremely negative 1985 New York Magazine article, "A Different Kind of Donald Trump Story", regarding his failed attempts to forcibly and illegally evict rent-controlled and rent-stabilized tenants from a building that he had bought on Central Park South in 1982. To Schwartz's amazement, Trump loved the article and even had the cover, which had an unflattering portrait of him, autographed by Schwartz and hung in his office. Schwartz was hired to write the book for $250,000 upfront; Trump assigned him half of the royalties. Schwartz later admitted that his motivation was purely financial. He needed the money to support his new family. 

According to Schwartz in July 2016, Trump did not write any of the book, choosing only to remove a few critical mentions of business colleagues at the end of the process. Trump responded with conflicting stories, saying "I had a lot of choice of who to have write the book, and I chose Schwartz", but then said "Schwartz didn't write the book. I wrote the book." Former Random House head Howard Kaminsky, the book's original publisher, said "Trump didn't write a postcard for us!" The book was published with the authorship given as "Donald Trump with Tony Schwartz". In 2019, Schwartz suggested that the work be "recategorized as fiction."

To inform the content and style, Schwartz drew on the already-substantial archive of news, profiles and books about Trump as well as interviews with Trump associates. When interviews with Trump himself proved unproductive, the two struck on an unusual alternative: Schwartz listened in on Trump's office phone calls for several months to witness him in action. The experience was condensed into chapter one, "Dealing: A Week in the Life," which introduces the reader to countless boldface names and events. The chapter was excerpted in New York Magazine to promote the book and served as a blueprint for future autobiographies.

Schwartz was the subject of a July 2016 article in The New Yorker in which he describes Trump unfavorably and relates how he came to regret writing The Art of the Deal. He also stated that if it were to be written today it would be very different and titled The Sociopath. Schwartz repeated his self-criticism on Good Morning America, saying he had "put lipstick on a pig." In response to these claims, Trump's attorneys demanded that Schwartz cede all his royalties from the book to Trump.

Publication and promotion
The Art of the Deal was published in November 1987 by Random House. A promotional campaign was undertaken in conjunction with its release. This included Trump holding a release party at Trump Tower, hosted by Jackie Mason, featuring a celebrity-filled guest list. There were a series of appearances by him on television talk shows. Trump also appeared on a number of magazine covers as part of publicity for the book.

Two months before publication, in a more cynical bid to promote the book, Trump waded into national politics. On September 2, 1987, working with his publicist, Dan Klores, and long-running political interlocutor, Roger Stone, Trump ran full-page ads in major newspapers excoriating Washington for defending allies on the American taxpayers' dime. On October 22, he spoke to a New Hampshire crowd under the aegis of a "Draft Trump" movement. Of the speech, Trump said in early 2016, "I wasn’t even thinking about [running for president] ... It was a lot to do with my book." "He didn't run," gloated Klores, "but it was probably the greatest book promotion of all time."

Excerpts from the book were published in New York magazine. The book has been translated into over a dozen languages.

Royalties
Trump and Schwartz had an agreement to split royalties from the sale of the book on a 50–50 basis.

In 1988, Trump set up the Donald J. Trump Foundation to give away the book's royalties, in Trump's words, promising four or five million dollars "to the homeless, to Vietnam veterans, for AIDS, multiple sclerosis". According to a Washington Post investigation those promised donations largely failed to materialize; the paper said "he gave less to those causes than he did to his older daughter's ballet school". The Washington Post asked the Trump's 2016 presidential campaign if he had donated the $55,000 of royalties he had earned from the book in the first six months of 2016 to charity, as he promised in the 1980s, and it did not respond.

By 2016, Schwartz said he had received some $1.6 million in royalty payments. Schwartz said he would be donating six months of royalties (worth $55,000) to the National Immigration Law Center, which advocates for immigrants to remain in the United States regardless of whether or not their entry was legal. Schwartz had earlier donated royalties he received in the second half of 2015, worth $25,000, to a number of charities including the National Immigration Forum. Schwartz said he wanted to help the people Trump was attacking.

Financial disclosures by Trump for 2018 revealed the book earned over $1 million that year, and it was the only title of his dozen-plus authored books that made money. Trump's financial disclosures for 2019 reported royalties for The Art of the Deal in the $100,000 to $1 million range.

Book sales
Precise figures of the number of copies sold of The Art of the Deal are unavailable because its publication preceded the Nielsen BookScan era. It had a first printing of 150,000 copies. Several magazine and book accounts state that it sold over one million hardcover copies or one million copies.  A 2016 CBS News investigation reported that an unnamed source familiar with the book's sales placed the figure at 1.1 million copies sold.

Trump said in his 2016 presidential campaign that The Art of the Deal is "the No. 1 selling business book of all time". An analysis by PolitiFact found that other business books had sold many more copies than The Art of the Deal. While it is impossible to find exact sales figures, a range of possibilities based on known claims and facts were given. When compared to six other famous business books, The Art of the Deal ranked in fifth place according to the analysis; the top-selling book, How to Win Friends and Influence People, outsold it by a factor of 15 times.

Reception and legacy
At the time of publication, Publishers Weekly called it a "boastful, boyishly disarming, thoroughly engaging personal history". People magazine gave it a mixed review.

Three years later, journalist John Tierney noted Trump "appears to have ignored some of his own advice" in the book due to "well-publicized problems with his banks". Trump's self-promotion, best-selling book and media celebrity status led one commentator in 2006 to call him "a poster-child for the 'greed is good' 1980s". (The phrase "Greed is good" is from the movie Wall Street, which was released a month after The Art of the Deal.)

Jim Geraghty in the National Review said in 2015 that the book showed "a much softer, warmer, and probably happier figure than the man dominating the airwaves today".

John Paul Rollert, an ethicist writing about the book in The Atlantic in 2016, says Trump sees capitalism not as an economic system but a morality play.

The book coined the phrase "truthful hyperbole" describing "an innocent form of exaggeration—and... a very effective form of promotion". Schwartz said Trump loved the phrase. In January 2017, the phrase was noted for its similarity to the phrase "alternative facts" coined by Counselor to the President Kellyanne Conway when she defended White House Press Secretary Sean Spicer's widely derided statements about the attendance at Trump's inauguration as President of the United States.

In 2021, Yuri Shvets, an ex-KGB agent, claimed that Trump had been cultivated by the KGB for 40-years, starting in the 1980s as tensions between the United States and Soviet Union were thawing. In The Art of the Deal, Trump acknowledges the potential business opportunities arising from the positive turn in the relationship between the U.S. and the Soviet Union which includes the possibility of building "a large luxury hotel across the street from the Kremlin in partnership with the Soviet government." It was during this period that the ex-KGB agent alleges to have discussed with Trump going into politics and were "stunned" when he returned to the US and took out a full-page ad parroting anti-Western Russian talking points.

Questions of veracity 

Biographers, associates and fact-checkers have cast doubt on the book's version of events. To those with detailed knowledge of the projects, the singular hero of the book appeared instead as a fictional composite of the many power-brokers, doers and domain experts who actually made things happen. This omniscient persona faced exaggerated odds and won overstated profits. As biographer Gwenda Blair wrote in 2000, "In The Art of the Deal, [Trump] claims that business deals are what distinguish him ... but his most original creation is the continuous self-inflation." Still, those tracing out Trump's life could not discern the more limited reality all at once. Speaking twenty years later, Blair bemoaned her failure, as a biographer, to have "understood how fabricated [the book] was ... how that founding myth was so riddled with at best exaggeration."

Chapter four, "The Cincinnati Kid," tells the story of Trump's "first big deal." According to the book, Donald came up with the idea of buying Swifton Village, a struggling apartment complex in Cincinnati. He partnered with his dad to turn Swifton around, then, just as the neighborhood headed irretrievably downhill, tricked a buyer into overpaying: "The price was $12 million—or approximately a $6 million profit for us. It was a huge return on a short-term investment." Roy Knight, part of the Village's maintenance crew, told reporters that the project was actually Fred Trump's "baby"; biographers generally agree. Donald was cloistered at New York Military Academy when his father boarded a plane to Ohio and won the property at auction. He attended college while Fred turned things around. The young scion did visit on occasion but only to do "yardwork and cleaning." Finally, the sale price was a mere $6.75 million, $1 million more than the purchase price, representing little if any profit after eight years of expenses (estimated at $500,000) and interest.

Chapter six, "Grand Hyatt" tells the story of Trump's true first big deal. Without it, the book opined, "I’d probably be back in Brooklyn today, collecting rents." In his 1992 biography of Trump, journalist Wayne Barrett, who had covered the project in detail, took issue with many of the book's claims. In particular, he noted the absence of nearly all the key players—from New York governor Hugh Carey, a longtime Trump-family crony, to city planners betting their careers on the novel private-public partnership, to Trump's omnipresent number two, Louise Sunshine (herself Carey's former chief fundraiser). "In The Art of the Deal," Barrett wrote, "it was as if Donald walked out onstage alone."

Chapter seven, "Trump Tower," opens with a fully-hatched plan. "In order to put up the building I had in mind," Trump takes us through his thinking, "I was going to have to assemble several ... adjacent pieces—and then seek numerous zoning variances." George Ross, one of Trump's lawyers on the project and later his lieutenant on The Apprentice, seasons 1-5, recalled the process differently. Where Trump depicted himself expertly pouring over his "air-rights contract" and "discover[ing] an unexpected bonus," Ross wrote: "I enlightened Donald about the zoning laws that permitted one owner to sell and transfer unused building rights (commonly called air rights)." One key step involved the adjacent Tiffany store. "Unfortunately, I didn’t know anyone at Tiffany," Trump wrote, "and the owner, Walter Hoving, was known not only as a legendary retailer but also as a difficult, demanding, mercurial guy." Nonetheless, the tyro cold-called Hoving and tricked him into a one-sided deal. Per Ross, however, the transaction was aboveboard and owed entirely to Trump's well-connected elder: "Donald's father and Walter Hoving had done some business together and Donald's father suggested to Donald that he could work out a fair deal with Hoving in a short period of time."

Based on Trump's tax returns between 1985 and 1994 which showed a loss greater than "nearly any other individual American taxpayer" during that period, co-author Schwartz suggested that the book might be "recategorized as fiction".

Film and TV 

In 1988, Trump and Ted Turner announced plans for a television film based on the book. The plans had been largely abandoned by 1991.

Mark Burnett, creator of The Apprentice, credited the book for inspiring "his leap from selling T-shirts off racks on Venice Boulevard in Los Angeles to producing television shows," and later, after success with Survivor, the idea of a show starring Trump himself. Trump's monologue opened the long-running show: "I've mastered the art of the deal ... And as the master I want to pass my knowledge along to somebody else. I'm looking for... The Apprentice."

Aspects of the book were used as the basis for the 2016 parody film Donald Trump's The Art of the Deal: The Movie.

See also

 Bibliography of Donald Trump
 List of autobiographies by presidents of the United States

Notes
 Ross's book opens with an image of his signed copy of Art of the Deal. In it, Trump penned, "Only you and I know how important a role you played in my success."

References

1987 non-fiction books
American memoirs
Biographies about businesspeople
Non-fiction books adapted into films
Books about companies
Art of the Deal
Debut books
Finance books
Collaborative non-fiction books
Random House books
Self-help books
Books about Donald Trump
Donald Trump controversies
Books written by presidents of the United States